There are 1,774 species of crustaceans recorded in Ireland.

Crustaceans are arthropods of the subphylum Crustacea. Most are aquatic, such as shrimp, barnacles, lobsters, crayfish, krill, but some are also adapted for land living, such as woodlice and crabs.

Class Branchiopoda (water fleas, etc.)

Order Anomopoda

Family Bosminidae

Bosmina

Family Chydoridae
41 species
including
Kurzia latissima

Family Eurycercidae

Eurycercus lamellatus
Eurydice pulchra

Family Ilyocryptidae

Ilyocryptus sordidus

Family Daphniidae

12 species
including
Ceriodaphnia quadrangula
Daphnia longispina
Daphnia pulex
Simocephalus vetulus

Family Macrothricidae 
8 species

Order Ctenopoda

Family Sididae
3 species
Sida crystallina
Latona setifera

Family Holopediidae
1 species

Order Haplopoda

Family Leptodoridae 
1 species

Order Onychopoda

Family Polyphemidae
1 species
Polyphemus pediculus

Family Cercopagididae
2 species

Family Podonidae 
4 species

Class Malacostraca

Order Leptostraca

Family Nebaliidae 
2 species including
Nebalia bipes

Order Stomatopoda

Family Nannosquillidae 
1 species

Family Squillidae
1 species

Order Amphipoda

Family Aoridae
15 species including
Aora gracilis
Lembos websteri
Microdeutopus anomalus

Family Ampeliscidae
15 species including  
Ampelisca aequicornis
Ampelisca brevicornis
Ampelisca diadema
Ampelisca spinipes
Ampelisca tenuicornis
Ampelisca typica

Family Ampithoidae
6 species including
Amphitholina cuniculus
Ampithoe gammaroides
Ampithoe helleri
Ampithoe rubricata
Sunamphitoe pelagica

Family Calliopiidae

Calliopius laeviusculus

Family Caprellidae (skeleton shrimps, ghost shrimps)

11 species including
Caprella acanthifera
Caprella equilibra
Caprella linearis
Caprella mutica (Japanese skeleton shrimp)
Phtisica marina
Pariambus typicus

Family Cheirocratidae
1 species
Cheirocratus sundevalli

Family Corophiidae
14 species including
Chelicorophium chelicorne
Corophium arenarium
Corophium crassicorne
Corophium curvispinum
Corophium volutator
Ericthonius punctatus

Family Crangonyctidae
1 species  
Crangonyx pseudogracilis

Family Eusiridae
6 species

Family Calliopidae
1 species

Family Dexaminidae
8 species including 
Dexamine spinosa

Family Eulimnogammaridae

Eulimnogammarus obtusatus

Family Gammaridae
15-16 species

Echinogammarus marinus
Echinogammarus pirloti
Echinogammarus stoerensis
Gammarus duebeni
Gammarus finmarchicus
Gammarus lacustris 
Gammarus locusta
Gammarus pulex
Gammarus tigrinus
Gammarus zaddachi

Family Gammarellidae
2 species

Family Megaluropidae
1 species
Megaluropus agilis

Family Talitridae (landhoppers, sandhoppers, sand fleas)

6 species 
Arcitalitrus dorrieni
Orchestia gammarellus
Orchestia mediterranea
Pseudorchestoidea brito
Talitrus saltator
Talorchestia deshayesii

Family Melphidippidae 
2 species

Family Haustoriidae
1 species
Haustorius arenarius

Family Hyperiidae

7 species including
Hyperia galba

Family Hyalidae
6 species  
Hyale pontica
Hyale prevostii
Hyale stebbingi

Family Ischyroceridae
14 species including
Ischyrocerus anguipes
Jassa falcata (scud)
Parajassa pelagica
Siphonoecetes kroyeranus

Family Leucothoidae
4 species
Leucothoe lilljeborgi

Family Colomastigidae
1 species

Family Cressidae
1 species

Family Stenothoidae
10 species including
Stenothoe marina

Family Lysianassidae
42 species including   
Lysianassa ceratina
Orchomenella nana

Family Synopiidae
2 species

Family Argissidae 
1 species

Family Iphimediidae 
6 species

Family Stegocephalidae
1 species

Family Acanthonotozomellidae
1 species

Family Epimeriidae
1 species

Family Liljeborgiidae
3 species

Family Pardaliscidae 
1 species

Family Melitidae
13 species including
Melita palmata
Abludomelita obtusata
Maerella tenuimana

Family Niphargidae
3 species 
Microniphargus leruthi
Niphargus kochianus subsp. irlandicus
Niphargus wexfordensis

Family Oedicerotidae
11 species including
Perioculodes longimanus
Pontocrates altamarinus
Pontocrates arenarius
Monocorophium acherusicum
Synchelidium maculatum

Family Pleustidae
5 species

Family Amphilochidae 
5-6 species including
Amphilochus neapolitanus

Family Cyproideidae
1 species

Family Phoxocephalidae
8-9 species 
Harpinia antennaria

Family Photidae
8 species including
Gammaropsis nitida
Gammaropsis maculata

Family Pontoporeiidae

7 species
Ampelisca aequicornis
Bathyporeia elegans
Bathyporeia guilliamsoniana
Bathyporeia nana
Bathyporeia pelagica
Bathyporeia pilosa
Bathyporeia tenuipes

Family Urothoidae
3 species 
Urothoe brevicornis 
Urothoe elegans 
Urothoe marina 
Urothoe poseidonis

Family Isaeidae
2 species including
Microprotopus maculatus

Family Microprotidae 
1 species

Family Cheluridae
1 species

Family Dulichiidae
2 species

Family Podoceridae 
3 species

Family Phtisicidae
2 species

Family Mimonectidae
2? species

Family Scinidae 
10 species

Family Lanceolidae
5 species

Family Vibiliidae 
4 species

Family Cystisomatidae
4 species

Family Dairellidae 
1 species

Family Phronimidae 
1 species

Family Phrosinidae
3 species

Family Pronoidae
1species

Family Brachyscelidae
1 species

Family Tryphanidae
1 species

Family Platyscelidae
1 species

Order Bathynellacea

Family Bathynellidae
1 species
Antrobathynella stammeri

Order Cumacea (hooded shrimp, comma shrimp)

Family Bodotriidae

9 species including
Bodotria scorpioides
Cumopsis fagei
Cumopsis goodsiri
Vaunthompsonia cristata

Family Diastylidae
12 species including
Diastylis rugosa
Diastylis bradyi
Diastylis laevis
Diastylis rathkei

Family Leuconidae 
2 species

Family Nannastacidae 
6 species

Family Pseudocumatidae 
2 species
Pseudocuma longicorne
Pseudocuma simile

Family Lampropidae 
2 species

Order Euphausiacea

Family Bentheuphausiidae
1 species

Family Euphausiidae
13 species

Order Decapoda

Family Aristeidae
1 species

Family Benthesicymidae
2 species

Family Solenoceridae
1 species

Family Sergestidae 
3 species

Family Stenopodidae 
1 species

Family Pasiphaeidae 
4 species

Family Oplophoridae
9 species

Family Bresiliidae 
1 species

Family Nematocarcinidae  
2 species

Family Palaemonidae
6 species

Family Processidae
2 species

Family Lithodidae
2 species

Family Chirostylidae
3 species

Family Homolidae
 1 species

Family Cymonomidae
1 species

Family Glyphocrangonidae
1 species

Family Laomediidae
1 species

Family Polychelidae
8 species

Family Akanthophoreidae

Akanthophoreus gracilis

Family Alpheidae (snapping shrimp, pistol shrimp, alpheid shrimp)
3 species including
Alpheus macrocheles

Family Astacidae (freshwater crayfish)
1 species
Austropotamobius pallipes (white-clawed crayfish, Atlantic stream crayfish)

Family Atelecyclidae

1 species 
Atelecyclus rotundatus (circular crab, round crab, old man's face crab)

Family Thiidae
1 species

Family Axiidae
2 species including
Calocaris macandreae

Family Callianassidae
2 species including
Callianassa subterranea (mud shrimp, ghost shrimp)

Family Calliopiidae

Apherusa jurinei

Family Cancridae

2 species including 
Cancer pagurus (edible crab, brown crab)

Family Corystidae

1 species 
Corystes cassivelaunus (masked crab, helmet crab, sand crab)

Family Crangonidae
11 species including
Crangon allmanni
Crangon crangon (brown shrimp, common shrimp, bay shrimp, sand shrimp)
Pontophilus spinosus

Family Diogenidae (left-handed hermit crabs)

1 species 
Diogenes pugilator (small hermit crab, south-claw hermit crab)

Family Epialtidae

Pisa tetraodon

Family Galatheidae

10 species including
Galathea intermedia
Galathea nexa
Galathea squamifera (black squat lobster, Montagu's plated lobster)
Galathea strigosa
Munida rugosa (rugose squat lobster, plated lobster)

Family Goneplacidae

1 species 
Goneplax rhomboides (angular crab)

Family Grapsidae (marsh crabs, shore crabs, talon crabs)

2 species including 
Eriocheir sinensis (Chinese mitten crab, Shanghai hairy crab)

Family Hippolytidae (broken-back shrimp, anemone shrimp)
13 species including
Hippolyte varians
Thoralus cranchii

Family Inachidae

Inachus dorsettensis (scorpion spider crab)
Inachus leptochirus
Inachus phalangium (Leach's spider crab)
Macropodia rostrata (common spider crab, long-legged spider crab, long-legged crab)
Macropodia tenuirostris (slender spider crab)

Family Leucosiidae

5 species including
Ebalia tuberosa
Ebalia tumefacta (Bryer's nut crab)

Family Majidae

17 species including
Eurynome aspera
Eurynome spinosa
Maja brachydactyla
Maja squinado (European spider crab, spiny spider crab, spinous spider crab)

Family Nephropidae (lobsters)

Homarus gammarus (European/common lobster)
3 species including
Nephrops norvegicus (Norway lobster, Dublin Bay prawn, langoustine, scampi)

Family Paguridae

11 species including
Anapagurus chiroacanthus
Anapagurus hyndmanni
Anapagurus laevis
Cestopagurus timidus
Pagurus bernhardus (common hermit crab, soldier crab)
Pagurus cuanensis
Pagurus prideaux
Pagurus pubescens

Family Parapaguridae
1 species

Family Oregoniidae

Hyas araneus (great spider crab)
Hyas coarctatus

Family Palaemonidae

Palaemon elegans
Palaemon serratus (common prawn)
Palaemonetes varians (common ditch shrimp, river shrimp, Atlantic ditch shrimp)

Family Palinuridae
2 species   including
Palinurus elephas (European spiny lobster, crayfish, cray, common spiny lobster, Mediterranean lobster, red lobster)

Family Pandalidae
5 species including
Pandalus montagui (pink shrimp, Aesop shrimp, Aesop prawn)

Family Pilumnidae

Pilumnus hirtellus (bristly crab, hairy crab)

Family Pinnotheridae
2 species including 
Pinnotheres pisum (pea crab)

Family Pirimelidae
1 species 
Pirimela denticulata

Family Porcellanidae (porcelain crab)
2 species 
Pisidia longicornis (long-clawed porcelain crab)
Porcellana platycheles (broad-clawed porcelain crab)

Family Portunidae (swimming crabs)

14 species including
Carcinus maenas (European green crab, European shore crab)
Liocarcinus corrugatus (wrinkled swimming crab)
Liocarcinus depurator (harbour crab, sandy swimming crab)
Liocarcinus holsatus (flying crab)
Liocarcinus marmoreus (marbled swimming crab)
Liocarcinus navigator (arch-fronted swimming crab)
Liocarcinus pusillus (dwarf swimming crab)
Necora puber (velvet crab)
Portumnus latipes (pennant's swimming crab)

Family Geryonidae
3 species

Family Thoridae (broken-back shrimp, anemone shrimp)

Eualus occultus
Eualus pusiolus

Family Upogebiidae
2 species
Upogebia deltaura
Upogebia stellata

Family Xanthidae (mud crabs, pebble crabs, rubble crabs)

6 species including 
Xantho hydrophilus
Xantho pilipes

Order Isopoda

Family Anthuridae

Cyathura carinata

Family Arcturidae
3 species
Astacilla longicornis

Family Armadillidiidae (pill bugs, roly polies, doodle bugs)
7 species

Armadillidium album
Armadillidium vulgare (pill-bug, pill woodlouse, roly-poly, doodle bug, potato bug, carpenter)

Family Asellidae

Asellus aquaticus (waterlouse, aquatic sowbug, water hoglouse)
Proasellus meridianus (one-spotted waterlouse, one-spotted water-slater)

Family Atylidae

Nototropis swammerdamei
Nototropis falcatus

Family Cirolanidae

10 species

Eurydice pulchra (speckled sea louse)
Eurydice affinis

Family Idoteidae

8 species
Idotea baltica
Idotea chelipes
Idotea granulosa
Idotea linearis
Idotea neglecta
Idotea pelagica

Family Janiridae
10 species  
Ianiropsis breviremis
Jaera albifrons
Jaera forsmani
Jaera nordmanni 
Janira maculosa

Family Ligiidae
1 species
Ligia oceanica (sea slater, common sea slater, sea roach)

Family Limnoriidae (gribble worms)
2 species  
Limnoria lignorum (gribble)

Family Munnidae
4 species
Munna kroyeri

Family Oniscidae
1 species
Oniscus asellus (common woodlouse)

Family Philosciidae
1 species
Philoscia muscorum (common striped woodlouse, fast woodlouse)

Family Porcellionidae
8 species

Porcellio scaber (common rough woodlouse)
Porcellionides pruinosus

Family Sphaeromatidae

Dynamene bidentata
Lekanesphaera hookeri
Lekanesphaera rugicauda (Sphaeroma rugicauda)
Sphaeroma serratum

Family Trichoniscidae
13 species
Androniscus dentiger (rosy / pink woodlouse)
Trichoniscus pusillus (common pygmy woodlouse)

Family Paramunnidae 
2 species

Family Pleurogonidae 
2 species

Family Thambematidae 
1 species

Family Desmosomatidae 
2 species

Family Eurycopidae 
6 species

Family Ischnomesidae
2 species

Family Munnopsididae 
2 species

Family Bopyridae 
7 species

Family Hemioniscidae 
1 species

Family Phryxidae 
3 species

Family Styloniscidae 
1species

Family Halophilosciidae 
1 species

Family Platyarthridae 
1 species

Family Cylisticidae 
1 species

Family Leptanthuridae
1 species

Family Ancinidae
1 species

Family Aegidae
6 species

Family Dendrotiidae 
2 species

Family Haploniscidae 
10 species

Family Ilyarachnidae 
1 species

Order Mysida (opossum shrimps)

Family Petalophthalmidae
3 species

Family Mysidae
66 species  including

Gastrosaccus spinifer
Hemimysis anomala (bloody-red mysid)
Leptomysis gracilis
Leptomysis lingvura
Mysis relicta
Neomysis integer
Praunus flexuosus (chameleon shrimp)

Order Tanaidacea (tanaids)

Pseudoparatanais batei (incerta sedis)

Family Tanaidae
1 species
Tanais dulongii

Family Paratanaidae 
2 species

Family Anarthruridae 
3 species

Family Typhlotanaidae 
2 species

Family Nototanaidae 
1species

Family Neotanaidae 
2 species

Family Apseudidae 
1 species

Family Sphyrapidae
2 species

Class Maxillopoda

Order Arguloida

Family Argulidae (carp lice, fish lice)

2 species including
Argulus foliaceus (common fish louse)

Order Misophrioida

Family Misophriidae
1 species

Order Calanoida

Family Calocalanidae
5 species including
Calocalanus contractus

Family Diaptomidae
6 species including
Diaptomus castor

Family Temoridae 
4 species

Family Metridinidae 
10 species

Family Centropagidae
6 species

Family Lucicutiidae 
8 species

Family Heterorhabdidae
12 species

Family Augaptilidae
28 species

Family Arietellidae 
6 species

Family Nullosetigeridae
2 species

Family Pseudocyclopidae 
2 species

Family Candaciidae
6 species

Family Pontellidae
4 species

Family Parapontellidae
1 species

Family Bathypontiidae 
1 species

Family Acartiidae
4 species

Family Clausocalanidae 
5 species

Family Calanidae 
7 species

Family Mecynoceridae 
1 species

Family Eucalanidae
4 species

Family Megacalanidae
3 species

Family Paracalanidae 
3 species

Family Spinocalanidae
7 species

Family Aetideidae
35 species

Family Euchaetidae
12 species

Family Phaennidae 
12 species

Family Scolecitrichidae 
22 species

Family Diaixidae 
2 species

Family Stephidae 
3 species

Family Tharybidae 
3 species

Family Pseudocyclopiidae
1 species

Order Kentrogonida

Family Sacculinidae
1 species
Sacculina carcini

Order Apygophora

Family Trypetesidae
2 species

Order Cyclopoida

Family Enteropsidae

Mychophilus roseus

Family Oithonidae 
6 species

Family Cyclopinidae 
8 species

Family Oithonidae 
6 species

Family Cyclopinidae 
8 species

Family Cyclopidae 
41 species

Family Notodelphyidae 
23 species

Family Ascidicolidae  
12 species

Order Harpacticoida

Family Cylindropsyllidae
3 species
Cylindropsyllus laevis

Family Dactylopusiidae

Diarthrodes roscoffensis

Family Harpacticidae

12 species

Tigriopus brevicornis (tigger-pod)

Family Longipediidae
6 species

Family Canuellidae 
2 species

Family Aegisthidae
2 species

Family Ectinosomatidae 
16-17 species

Family Darcythompsoniidae 
2 species

Family Euterpinidae
1 species

Family Tachidiidae
5 species

Family Thompsonulidae
1 species

Family Tisbidae
18 species

Family Porcellidiidae
4-5 species

Family Peltidiidae
8 species

Family Clytemnestridae
2 species

Family Tegastidae 
4 species

Family Thalestridae 
34 species

Family Ambunguipedidae
1 species

Family Balaenophilidae 
1 species

Family Parastenheliidae
1 species

Family Diosaccidae 
38 species

Family Metidae 
1 species

Family Ameiridae 
23 species

Family Paramesochridae 
5 species

Family Tetragonicipitidae 
6 species

Family Canthocamptidae
26 species

Family Orthopsyllidae 
1 species

Family Leptastacidae
2 species

Family Cletodidae 
8 species

Family Huntemanniidae 
1 species

Family Rhizothricidae 
3 species

Family Argestidae
2 species

Family Laophontidae 
36 species

Family Laophontopsidae 
1 species

Family Normanellidae 
2 species

Family Ancorabolidae 
3 species

Order Mormonilloida

Family Mormonillidae 
2 species

Order Poecilostomatoida

Family Ergasilidae 
3 species

Family Rhynchomolgidae 
4 species

Family Macrochironidae  
1 species

Family Sabelliphilidae  
4 species

Family Lichomolgidae  
16-17 species

Family Pseudanthessiidae  
5 species

Family Oncaeidae  
14 species

Family Sapphirinidae  
2 species

Family Clausidiidae  
3 species

Family Synaptiphilidae 
1 species

Family Mytilicolidae  
3 species

Family Anthessiidae  
1 species

Family Myicolidae  
1 species

Family Corycaeidae  
2-3 species

Family Bomolochidae  
2 species

Family Taeniacanthidae  
2 species

Family Chondracanthidae  
6 species

Family Splanchnotrophidae  
3 species

Family Philichthyidae  
1 species

Family Lamippidae  
2 species

Family Synapticolidae  
1 species

Family Phyllodicolidae  
1 species

Family Herpyllobiidae  
1 species

Order Siphonostomatoida

Family Rataniidae
1 species

Family Asterocheridae 
16 species

Family Artotrogidae 
1 species

Family Dyspontiidae 
5 species

Family Nanaspididae 
1 species

Family Micropontiidae 
1 species

Family Cancerillidae 
2 species

Family Nicothoidae 
8 species

Family Melinnacheridae 
1 species

Family Caligidae 
18 species including
Lepeophtheirus pectoralis

Family Trebiidae 
1 species

Family Pandaridae 
3 species

Family Cecropidae 
3 species

Family Dichelesthiidae 
1species

Family Hatschekiidae 
1 species

Family Lernanthropidae 
1 species

Family Pennellidae 
6 species

Family Sphyriidae 
2 species

Family Lernaeopodidae
10-11 species

Order Monstrilloida

Family Monstrillidae 
7 species

Order Scalpellomorpha

Family Lepadidae

6 species
Lepas anatifera (pelagic gooseneck barnacle, smooth gooseneck barnacle)
Dosima fascicularis

Order Scalpelliformes

Family Scalpellidae
4 species including

Scalpellum scalpellum

Order Sessilia (acorn barnacles)

Family Coronulidae 
2 species

Family Tetraclitidae 
1 species

Family Archaeobalanidae
3 species including
Semibalanus balanoides

Family Balanidae

6-7 species including
Balanus balanus
Balanus crenatus
Balanus perforatus
Elminius modestus

Family Chthamalidae

2 species
Chthamalus montagui (Montagu's stellate barnacle)
Chthamalus stellatus (Poli's stellate barnacle)

Family Pyrgomatidae
1 species
Megatrema anglicum (Boscia anglica)

Family Verrucidae
1 species
Verruca stroemia

Order Porocephalida

Family Linguatulidae
1 species

Order Platycopioida

Family Platycopiidae  
1species

Class Ostracoda (seed shrimps)

Order Myodocopida

Family Cylindroleberididae
2 species

Family Philomedidae
1species

Order Halocyprida

Family Polycopidae 
2 species

Order Podocopida

Family Bythocytheridae 
2-3 species

Family Cytheridae 
1species

Family Cytherideidae 
4 species

Family Krithidae 
1 species

Family Cuneocytheridae 
1 species

Family Cytheruridae 
13 species

Family Hemicytheridae 
5 species

Family Leptocytheridae 
4 species

Family Limnocytheridae
5 species

Family Loxoconchidae 
8 species

Family Neocytherideidae 
1 species

Family Paradoxostomatidae 
11 species

Family Trachyleberididae 
6 species

Family Xestoleberididae 
2 species

Family Darwinulidae 
2 species

Family Candonidae
22 species including
Candona candida

Family Cyprididae
25 species including
Cypris

Family Ilyocyprididae 
2 species

Family Pontocyprididae 
3 species

See also
Crabs of the British Isles

References

P. J. Hayward and J. S. Ryland Eds., 1999 The Marine Fauna of the British Isles and North-West Europe: Volume II: Molluscs to Chordates Oxford University Press 
Howson, C.M. & Picton, B.E.(eds) 1997. The species directory of the marine fauna and flora of the British Isles and surrounding seas.Ulster Museum and The Marine Conservation Society, Belfast and Ross-on-Wye.
 Gofas, S.; Le Renard, J.; Bouchet, P. (2001). Mollusca, in: Costello, M.J. et al. (Ed.) (2001). European register of marine species: a check-list of the marine species in Europe and a bibliography of guides to their identification. Collection Patrimoines Naturels, 50: pp. 180–213

 
Fauna Europaea  (land and freshwater) finds 207 species in Ireland for Subphylum Crustacea

External links
World Register of Marine Species

Ireland, crust
Ireland
crust